Luca Beltrami (November 13, 1854 – August 8, 1933) was an Italian architect and architectural historian, known particularly for restoration projects.

Biography
Beltrami was born in Milan.  He was initially a student at the Politecnico in Milan, then in the Brera Academy, where he studied under Camillo Boito. From there he moved to Paris, where he stayed till 1880. He was involved in works at Trocadero an at the Palace of the National Exhibitions. He was able to outscore those taking tests from the Ecole Nationale de Beaux Arts, and distinguished himself at the Salon with designs by aquaforte. He was nominated the second in command as inspector of the works of reconstruction at the Hotel de Ville of Paris. He collaborated with the architect Théodore Ballu in works on the Palace of Justice at Charleroi, Belgium.

Returning from Paris in 1880, he won a contest for the Cathedra of Geometry and Descriptive Architecture at the Academy of Fine Arts of Milan. By commission from the Ministry of Public Instruction, he recorded all the reliefs found at the Lazzaretto of Milan; the Castello Sforzesco of Milan, and the Rocca of  Soncino. He was responsible for the restoration of the Castello Sforzesco. He won a contest to design the Facade of the church of San Sebastiano in Biella, and a prize for his second design (submitted from Paris) for the Monument delle Cinque Giornate of Milan; and a third place prize for his design of the Hospital General of Charity in Turin.

He was also responsible for the design and construction of the base of the monument to Giuseppe Parini in Milan's Piazza Cordusio.

He is buried at the Cimitero Monumentale di Milano.

Honours 
 1896 : member of the Royal Academy of Science, Letters and Fine Arts of Belgium.

See also
Palazzo delle Assicurazioni Generali (Milan)

Notes

Resources

 . (Class notes for a course on the theory and history of architectural restoration.)

Architects from Milan
19th-century Italian architects
20th-century Italian architects
1854 births
1933 deaths
Italian architectural historians
Italian male non-fiction writers
Burials at the Cimitero Monumentale di Milano
Brera Academy alumni
Members of the Royal Academy of Belgium